Natalie Tychmini was a Russian woman who disguised herself as a man in order to fight in World War I. She received the Cross of St. George for fighting the Austrians in Opatów in 1915. Her sex was discovered when she was wounded, and she was sent back to Kiev.

References 

Year of birth missing
Year of death missing
Female wartime cross-dressers
Women in the Russian and Soviet military
Russian women of World War I